The Concession of Evoramonte, also known as the Convention of Evoramonte, was a document signed on 26 May 1834, in Evoramonte, in Alentejo, between the Constitutionalists and the Miguelites, that ended the period of civil war (1828–1834) in the Kingdom of Portugal.

On the Concession of Evoramonte, Dom Miguel I of Portugal, to end the bloodbath in the country after six years of civil war, surrendered and abandoned his claim to the Portuguese throne, being also subjected to exile and perpetual banishment from the Kingdom of Portugal.

It was signed by the representatives of the Constitutionalists, the Marshals of the Army, Duke of Terceira and Count of Saldanha, and by the Miguelite representative, Lieutenant General José António Azevedo e Lemos.

Articles of the Concession of Evoramonte
The Concession was initially composed of nine articles, with four more added the following day:

Article 1 - General amnesty was granted to all political crimes committed since 21 July 1826.
Article 2 - Any person comprehended by the amnesty, national or foreign citizen, could freely leave the Kingdom with their property.
Article 3 - All military officers could keep their ranks legitimately conferred to them.
Article 4 - To all public and ecclesiastical employees, the same allowance would be contemplated, if their services and qualities would render them worthy.
Article 5 - An annual pension of 60 contos de réis (12 000l.) was granted to Dom Miguel in deference of his royal ancestry; and he was allowed to dispose of his personal property, restoring however any jewels and other articles belonging to the Crown or private individuals.
Article 6 - Dom Miguel could leave the Kingdom in a warship of the Allied Powers, which would be ready in any port he desired, being assured of total safety to him and his followers.
Article 7 - Dom Miguel was permanently banned from the kingdom (and all its colonial possessions), a measure to be enforced within a fortnight.
Article 8 - All troops loyal to Dom Miguel were to deliver their weapons on a depot indicated to them.
Article 9 - All the Regiments and Corps loyal to Dom Miguel should peacefully disband themselves.

Additional articles:

Article 1 - Orders would be immediately expedited to all Commanders of garrisons of the forces in campaign, and to all authorities who were still recognizing the government of Dom Miguel, that they should submit to the Government of Queen Maria II.
Article 2 - The tenor of the previous article would extend to all ecclesiastical, civil and military authorities of the colonial possessions of the Monarchy. 
Article 3 - Dom Miguel should leave Évora on 30 May, for the town of Sines, where his embarkation for exile would take place. 
Article 4 - On 31 May, the troops of Dom Miguel would deposit their weapons in Évora at the local College.

Protest of Genoa
Immediately after arriving at Genoa, the place of his exile, on 20 June 1834, Dom Miguel addressed himself to the Courts of Europe claiming that the Concession of Evoramonte was illegal, as it had been imposed on him by force by the governments of the Quadruple Alliance:

See also 

 1834 Quadruple Alliance

References

Sources
John Athelstane Smith, Conde da Carnota, Memoirs of Field-Marshal the Duke de Saldanha, with Selections from His Correspondence. Volume 1 
Hernâni Cidade, História de Portugal: Implantação do Regime Liberal - Da revolução de 1820 á queda da Monarquia (2004)  
H. Colburn, The United Service Journal, Part III (1834)

1834 in Portugal
Liberal Wars
Treaties of the Kingdom of Portugal
1834 treaties
May 1834 events